Britské listy is a Czech-language cultural and political internet daily. It is published by a reader-financed NGO Britske Listy o.s. based in Prague.

The website was founded in July 1996 by Jan Čulík, Senior Lecturer in Czech Studies at the University of Glasgow, Scotland. Since it began, the website has argued that the purpose of its journalism is to introduce ideas from the outside world into a fairly enclosed, circular, Czech-language dependent political and cultural discourse within the Czech Republic. The main purpose of Britské listy has been to challenge ideas which it claims circulate uncritically within the Czech Republic.

Britské listy is one of several Knowledge Exchange projects operated by Glasgow University.

A poll of the readership conducted in 2007 showed a disproportionately high representation of urban men with higher education and high income.

Since April 2015, in cooperation with Regionální televise.cz, a Czech cable TV station, Britské listy broadcasts weekly fifteen-minute interviews on topical political and cultural issues.

In 2001, a Britské listy journalist, Tomas Pecina, was arrested and charged for criticising a new law passed in the Czech Republic prohibiting sympathy for the September 11 attacks in New York City.

Publications

Britské listy has published four book collections of its articles
 Jak Češi myslí (The Way Czechs Think), Chomutov: Millenium Publishing, 1999
 Jak Češi jednají (The Way Czechs Act), Chomutov: Millenium Publishing 2000, (with Tomáš Pecina)  
 V hlavních zprávách: Televise (On the Main News: Television), Prague: ISV, 2001
 Jak Češi bojují (The Way Czechs Fight), Prague, Libri, 2003.

References

External links 
www.blisty.cz, official website (ISSN 1213-1792) 
www.czechfocus.cz, Focus on the Czech Republic, an English-language project of Britské listy
CV and bibliography of Jan Čulík
automatically generated list of the most widely read articles each week

Internet properties established in 1996
Czech-language websites
Czech news websites
1996 establishments in the Czech Republic